Akçay (in Turkish: White Creek) is a municipality in the Edremit district of Balıkesir Province in western Turkey. It is located in the Edremit Bay at the coast of north-eastern Aegean Sea, across the Greek island Lesbos.

Akçay is 10 km west of Edremit on the highway D560 (E-87) to Altınoluk. With its long beach and clear sea, it is a highly popular summer resort for domestic tourists. Its population grows around tenfold in the summer season. The very cool groundwater running into the sea keeps the sea fresh all summer long. 

Akçay has a mild climate in summer months; it is warm and dry, which makes it very attractive for tourists who prefer a low-key vacation without the crowdedness and the humid weather of the southern vacation resorts such as Antalya and Bodrum.

Places to visit in Akçay are plentiful from the Altınoluk to the Tahtakuslar Museum.

External links

 
 Akçay (Turkish)

Towns in Turkey
Populated places in Balıkesir Province